Haberfeld is a surname. Notable people with the surname include:
 David Haberfeld (born 1969), Australian musician and producer
 Győző Haberfeld (1889 – c. 1945), Hungarian gymnast
 Haim Haberfeld, Israeli trade union and football federation leader
 Hanna Zemer, née Haberfeld (1925–2003), Israeli journalist and first female editor-in-chief of a major Israeli newspaper
 Mario Haberfeld (born 1976), Brazilian auto racing driver

See also 
 Haberfeld Stadium, multi-purpose stadium in Rishon LeZion, Israel